Chinook's Edge School Division No. 73 or the Chinook's Edge Board of Education is a public school authority within the Canadian province of Alberta operated out of Innisfail.

See also 
List of school authorities in Alberta

References

External links 

School districts in Alberta